Arcahaie Football Club is a Haitian association football club based in Arcahaie, Ouest. The club currently competes in the Ligue Haïtienne.

Current squad

Coach:Gabriel Michel
Assistant:Pierre. Richard Elasmé

Honours
Ligue Haïtienne: 1
 2019–20

International Competitions 

 CONCACAF Champions League : 1 appearance

2021 - Round of 16 vs  Cruz Azul (H 0-0, A 0-8) Agg L 0-8
 CONCACAF League: 1 appearance
2020 - Semifinals vs  Saprissa L 0-5

References

External links 
 

Football clubs in Haiti